Serene Timeless Joy is an album by American composer Bill Laswell, issued under the moniker Rasa. It was released on July 13, 1999 by Meta Records.

Track listing

Personnel 
Adapted from the Serene Timeless Joy liner notes.
Musicians
Bill Laswell – bass guitar, effects, musical arrangements, producer
Technical personnel
Yalitza Ferreras – design
Michael Fossenkemper – mastering
Robert Musso – engineering

Release history

References

External links 
 Serene Timeless Joy at Bandcamp
 

1999 albums
Bill Laswell albums
Albums produced by Bill Laswell